Life expectancy in Russia is 70.06 years, according to official data for 2021. Russia's historical maximum life expectancy was 73.3 years, achieved in 2019. Life expectancy decreased by 1.8 years in 2020 and a further 1.48 years in 2021, due largely to the effect of the COVID-19 pandemic on Russia's aging society. There have been significant regional differences in COVID-19's impact on life expectancy, with this indicator decreasing by 2.42 years in Voronezh Oblast while simultaneously increasing by 0.89 years in Chechnya during this period.

Duration of life in Russia varies greatly between regions. Russians in the North Caucasus and in cities of federal importance have relatively high life expectancies, and Ingushetia is considered a "blue zone" due to its especially promising statistics. Life expectancy is relaively low in many regions of the Russian Far East, and as of 2022 Chukotka has the lowest life expectancy in Russia.

On average, Russians in towns live slightly longer than those in rural areas. However, in some regions the opposite pattern is observed, or scales in different years leans on different sides.

Annual estimates of life expectancy are provided by the World Health Organization. According ot the WHO, healthy life expectancy (HALE) in Russia in 2019 was 64.2 years: 60.7 for men and 67.5 for women. Also according to the WHO, Russia, Ukraine and Belarus exhibit the world's highest difference in life expectancy between women and men.

Official Russian data 2021 
List of the federal subjects of Russia by life expectancy provided by the Russian statistical agency Rosstat in 2022. In the last years Rosstat publishes data about life expectancy one time in two years, so the next release of official Russian data is expected in 2024.

Charts and maps

Official Russian data 2019 
Detailed data for 2019 and annual dynamics from 2014 to 2021.

See also

List of countries by life expectancy
List of European countries by life expectancy
List of Asian countries by life expectancy
List of U.S. states by life expectancy
Demographics of Russia
Healthcare in Russia

References

Health in Russia
Life expectancy
Russia, life expectancy
Russia
Life expectancy